Jia Sarai is an urban village in the south of New Delhi. It is one of the three villages, along with Ber Sarai and Katwaria Sarai, bordering the Indian Institute of Technology Delhi campus. Bhai Trilochan Singh Panesar, also known as Veerji belonged to this village.

References

Neighbourhoods in Delhi
Caravanserais in India